Paranthrenopsis is a genus of moths in the family Sesiidae.

Species
Paranthrenopsis editha (Butler, 1878)
Paranthrenopsis flavitaenia Wang & Yang, 2002
Paranthrenopsis flaviventris Kallies & Arita, 2001
Paranthrenopsis polishana (Strand, [1916])
Paranthrenopsis siniaevi Gorbunov & Arita, 2000
Paranthrenopsis taiwanella (Matsumura, 1931)

References

Sesiidae
Taxa named by Ferdinand Le Cerf
Moth genera